Leagrave is a village in Bedfordshire, England.

Leagrave may also refer to:
 Leagrave Bench, a style of traditional furniture
 Leagrave Railway Station